Histone-arginine N-methyltransferase (histone protein methylase I, nuclear protein (histone) N-methyltransferase, protein methylase I, S-adenosyl-L-methionine:histone-arginine omega-N-methyltransferase) is an enzyme with systematic name S-adenosyl-L-methionine:histone-arginine Nomega-methyltransferase. This enzyme catalyses the following chemical reaction

 S-adenosyl-L-methionine + histone-arginine  S-adenosyl-L-homocysteine + histone-Nomega-methyl-arginine

The enzyme forms the Nomega-monomethyl- and Nomega,Nomega'-dimethyl.

References

External links 
 

EC 2.1.1